Francis Campbell (1829–1897) was a member of the Wisconsin State Senate.

Biography
Campbell was born on 13 June 1829 in County Donegal, Ireland. He settled in Gratiot (town), Wisconsin in 1849. On 1 January 1860, Campbell married Mary J. Cole. They had five children.

Career
Campbell was elected to the Senate from the 11th District in 1872 and 1874. Other positions he held include Chairman of the Gratiot Town Board and Sheriff of Lafayette County, Wisconsin. He was a Republican.

References

1829 births
1897 deaths
Irish emigrants to the United States (before 1923)
People from Gratiot, Wisconsin
Politicians from County Donegal
Republican Party Wisconsin state senators
Wisconsin sheriffs
19th-century American politicians